Governador Lindenberg is the name of a Brazilian municipality in the southeastern state of Espírito Santo.  Its population was 12,880 (2020) and its area is 360 km².

As of 2001, an official flag was adopted, and the coat of arms designed by Andreia Freitas dos Santos won a school competition to choose the city's coat of arms, in which the prize was a television.

Located in the north of the state, roughly 200km from the capital of Vitória, this municipality gained independence from Colatina on July 29, 1997. Its colonization was made primarily through the access of the Doce River, by Italian immigrants, who settled there during the 19th century.

References

Municipalities in Espírito Santo